Rhombomantis is a genus of mantids in the family Mantidae. There are at least four described species in Rhombomantis.

Species
These four species belong to the genus Rhombomantis:
 Rhombomantis butleri (Wood-Mason, 1878)
 Rhombomantis fusca (Lombardo, 1992)
 Rhombomantis tectiformis (Saussure, 1870)
 Rhombomantis woodmasoni (Werner, 1931)

References

Further reading

 
 
 
 

Hierodulinae